Dott may refer to:

 Dott, Pennsylvania
 Dott, West Virginia
 Graeme Dott (born 1977), Scottish snooker player
 Marie-Luise Dött (born 1953), German politician
 Stefan Dott (born 1969), German judoka
Day of the Tentacle, a computer game by LucasArts
Designs of the Time, a Design Council programme to improve national life
Dott (transportation company)